Otisstraße is a Berlin U-Bahn station located on the  line.

The station is close to the street Otisstraße, hence the name. It was renamed in 2004 to celebrate the 150th year of operations of the local Otis Elevator Company and to correct a long-standing anomaly: this U6 line station was originally named Seidelstraße, even though its entrance was closer to Otisstraße.

It was constructed in 1958 by the architect B. Grimmek. In the beginning "Flugplatz Tegel" (Tegel Aerodrome) was appended to the station's name. This was changed to "Flughafen Tegel" (Tegel Airport) in 1961. This addition was deleted in 1974.

References

Railway stations in Germany opened in 1958

U6 (Berlin U-Bahn) stations
Buildings and structures in Reinickendorf